Synageles bishopi is a species of jumping spider. It is native to the continental United States.

References

External links
 

Salticidae
Articles created by Qbugbot
Spiders described in 1988